Julia Kate Drown (born 23 August 1962) is a British Labour Party politician.  She was the Member of Parliament (MP) for Swindon South, in south-west England, from 1997 until 2005.

Drown was a National Health Service accountant and member of Oxfordshire County Council before her election to parliament. A mother of young children, she was at the forefront of campaigns to make Parliament more child-friendly, including the allowing of breast-feeding. She stepped down at the 2005 election to spend more time with her children, although she did not rule out standing again for election at some point in the future.

As of May 2018, Drown holds several organisational positions. She chairs the Veterinary Medicines Directorate, and is a trustee of the Pension Scheme for the Nursing and Midwifery Council and Associated Employers. She also occasionally trains for Eden and Partners (a health sector leadership and training consultancy). Previously she was a member of the Human Fertilisation and Embryology Authority Appeals Committee, the Health Care Professions Council and the Audit Committee of the Nursing and Midwifery Council.

References 

1962 births
Living people
Labour Party (UK) MPs for English constituencies
Female members of the Parliament of the United Kingdom for English constituencies
UK MPs 1997–2001
UK MPs 2001–2005
Members of Oxfordshire County Council
Members of the Parliament of the United Kingdom for constituencies in Wiltshire
20th-century British women politicians
21st-century British women politicians
20th-century English women
20th-century English people
21st-century English women
21st-century English people
Women councillors in England